Brunneiapiospora is a genus of fungi in the family Clypeosphaeriaceae.

References

External links
Index Fungorum

Xylariales